Hare Moss is a bog in Aberdeenshire, Scotland, in the vicinity of Banchory-Devenick.  Hare Moss is a significant wetland ecosystem.

History
Hare Moss is situated along the ancient elevated Causey Mounth trackway, this road had to be constructed on high ground to make it the only passable medieval route from coastal points south of Stonehaven to Aberdeen. This ancient passage specifically connected the River Dee crossing (where the Bridge of Dee is situated) via Hare Moss, Muchalls Castle and Stonehaven to the south. The route was that taken by William Keith, 7th Earl Marischal and the Marquess of Montrose when they led a Covenanter army of 9000 men in the battle of the Civil War in 1639.

See also
Old Bourtreebush
Portlethen Moss

References

Bogs of Scotland
Landforms of Aberdeenshire